is a Japanese anime composer and arranger. He is known for his works on many anime series, including Future Diary, Food Wars: Shokugeki no Soma, Fate/kaleid liner Prisma Illya, Love Live! Sunshine!! and Free!. He is currently represented by the music production company APDREAM.

Biography
Kato was born in Funabashi, Chiba. He graduated from the film scoring program at the Tokyo College of Music and majored in composition and conducting. While there, he studied composition and arrangement under Shigeaki Saegusa, Katsuhisa Hattori, Reijiro Koroku, and Kentaro Haneda.

Works

Anime

 Spider Riders (2006) – with Fumitaka Anzai, Nobuhiko Nakayama, and Tomomasa Yoneda
 Kämpfer (2009)
 Miracle Train: Welcome to the Oedo Line (2009)
 Needless (2009)
 Phantom: Requiem for the Phantom (2009) – with Hikaru Nanase
 The Qwaser of Stigmata (2010)
 Demon King Daimao (2010)
 Goulart Knights (2010)
 Hyakka Ryōran Samurai Girls (2010)
 +Tic Elder Sister (2011)
 Horizon in the Middle of Nowhere (2011)
 Kämpfer: Für die Liebe (2011)
 T.P. Sakura: Time Paladin Sakura (2011)
 Future Diary (2011)
 Medaka Box (2012)
 Campione! (2012)
 Horizon in the Middle of Nowhere II (2012)
 Medaka Box Abnormal (2012)
 Hyakka Ryōran Samurai Bride (2013)
 Fate/kaleid liner Prisma Illya (2013)
 Free! - Iwatobi Swim Club (2013)
 Day Break Illusion (2013)
 Gingitsune (2013)
 Buddy Complex (2014)
 World Conquest Zvezda Plot (2014)
 Fate/kaleid liner Prisma Illya 2wei! (2014)
 Free! - Eternal Summer (2014)
 Celestial Method (2014)
 Yatterman Night (2015)
 Food Wars: Shokugeki no Soma (2015)
 The Disappearance of Nagato Yuki-chan (2015)
 Fate/kaleid liner Prisma Illya 2wei Herz! (2015)
 Comet Lucifer (2015)
 Luck & Logic (2016)
 Food Wars! Shokugeki no Soma: The Second Plate (2016)
 Love Live! Sunshine!! (2016)
 Matoi the Sacred Slayer (2016)
 Masamune-kun's Revenge (2017)
 WorldEnd (2017)
 Saiyuki Reload Blast (2017)
 Food Wars! Shokugeki no Soma: The Third Plate (2017)
 IDOLiSH7 (2018) 
 Kiratto Pri Chan (2018) 
 The Badminton Play of Ayano Hanesaki! (2018)
 Free! - Dive to the Future (2018)
 Revue Starlight (2018) – with Yoshiaki Fujisawa
 Fate/kaleid liner Prisma Illya: Prisma Phantasm (2019)
 Dr. Stone (2019) – with Hiroaki Tsutsumi and Yuki Kanesaka
 Ensemble Stars! (2019)
 Food Wars! Shokugeki no Soma: The Fourth Plate (2019)
 IDOLiSH7: Second Beat! (2020)
 Food Wars! Shokugeki no Soma: The Fifth Plate (2020)
 Dr. Stone: Stone Wars (2021) – with Hiroaki Tsutsumi and Yuki Kanesaka
 IDOLiSH7: Third Beat! (2021)
 Sakugan (2021)
 Parallel World Pharmacy (2022) – with Satoshi Hono
 Trigun Stampede (2023)
 Masamune-kun's Revenge R (2023)
 Genjitsu no Yohane: Sunshine in the Mirror (2023)

Films
 High Speed! Free! Starting Days (2015)
 Free! Timeless Medley (2017)
 Fate/kaleid liner Prisma Illya: Oath Under Snow (2017) – with Technoboys Pulcraft Green-Fund
 Free! Take Your Marks (2017)
 Love Live! Sunshine!! The School Idol Movie: Over The Rainbow (2019)
 Free! Road to the World - the Dream (2019)
 Revue Starlight: Rondo Rondo Rondo (2020) – with Yoshiaki Fujisawa
 Free! The Final Stroke - Part 1 (2021)
 Free! The Final Stroke - Part 2 (2022)

Other involvements

References

External links
 
 
 Discography at VGMdb

1980 births
21st-century Japanese composers
21st-century Japanese male musicians
Anime composers
Japanese film score composers
Japanese male film score composers
Japanese music arrangers
Japanese television composers
Living people
Male television composers
Musicians from Chiba Prefecture